The 1994 Alabama A&M Bulldogs football team represented Alabama A&M University as a member of the Southern Intercollegiate Athletic Conference (SIAC) during the 1994 NCAA Division II football season. Led by Reggie Oliver in his first and only season as head coach, the Bulldogs compiled an overall record of 4–7 with a mark of 4–4 in conference play, placing fifth in the SIAC.

Schedule

References

Alabama AandM
Alabama A&M Bulldogs football seasons
Alabama AandM Bulldogs football